Saint Maximilian of Lorch (also: Maximilian of Celeia, Latin: Maximilianus) (died 12 October 288) was a missionary in the Roman province of Noricum. He was martyred in AD 288.

Maximilian was born in Celeia in the Roman province of Noricum (in present-day Slovenia). As an adult he made a pilgrimage to Rome. Pope Sixtus II sent him to Lauriacum (Lorch) in the Roman province of Noricum, where he worked as a missionary during the latter half of the third century. He founded the church of Lorch. Maximilian was beheaded by the Roman Prefect of Emperor Numerian after refusing to abandon Christianity and sacrifice to the pagan gods. He is remembered on 12 October (and in some locations on 29 October).

His cult dates at least from the eighth century. In that century, Saint Rupert built a church in his honour at Bischofshofen in the Salzach valley, and brought his relics there. They were later transferred to Passau in 985.

References

People from Celje
3rd-century Christian saints
288 deaths
Year of birth unknown